Robert Lawrence Horne (born April 13, 1967) is an American semi-retired professional wrestler who is most famous for his time in the World Wrestling Federation from 1993 to 1996 under the ring name Mo (later Sir Mo), where he held the WWF World Tag Team Championship with Mabel as "Men on a Mission".

Professional wrestling career

Early career (1991-1993)

Robert Horne made his debut in 1991 and soon found himself teaming with Nelson Frazier in the Carolinas-based Pro Wrestling Federation. The two were kayfabe brothers in a team known as "The Harlem Knights" with Horne performing as "Bobby Knight" and Frazier performing as Nelson Knight. The heel team was managed by George South, who led the young team to two PWF Tag-Team titles over the years. In April 1992, Horne worked two matches for WWF both on Superstars. One in a tag match with Jim Brunzell losing to the Beverly Brothers and losing to The Mountie.

United States Wrestling Association (1993)

In 1993, The Harlem Knights moved on to the United States Wrestling Association based out of Memphis without their manager George South. While in the USWA, the team was pushed as the “Monster threat” due to their size and feuded with Jerry Lawler, Jeff Jarrett, and other faces. Their work in the PWF and the USWA got them noticed by the World Wrestling Federation (WWF) and they were signed to a contract in mid-1993.

World Wrestling Federation (1993-1996)

 
When Horne and Frazier made their WWF debut, the vicious heel duo had been repackaged as faces with a rap gimmick. They wore bright clothes and had positive attitudes. They were teamed up with a rapping manager “Oscar” and had their names changed to "Mo" (Horne) and "Mabel" (Frazier) while the team name was changed to “Men On a Mission” (or M.O.M., the initials of the three men). The team met with moderate success in the ring but got over mainly due to Mabel’s unusual size, their fun loving personas, and Oscar’s crowd pleasing raps. Their fun loving personalities were prominently displayed when they appeared at Survivor Series 1993 dressed up as Doinks (referred to by color commentator Bobby Heenan as "Doinks on a Mission)" and teamed up with The Bushwhackers (also dressed as Doink) in a comedy match.

Their next feud was against the WWF Tag Team Champions The Quebecers and they even won the titles during a United Kingdom tour. Two days later, however, the Quebecers regained the titles in a rematch. Mo injured his leg in a singles match against Owen Hart on the May 1 episode of Wrestling Challenge (taped April 12 in Syracuse, NY). Mo would not return to competition until October. That summer, Mabel started to wrestle more singles matches; he was seen as the spectacle of Men on a Mission due to his size, the "special attraction" that got used to make rising stars look good. It wasn't until the early parts of 1995, that Men on a Mission started to team again on a regular basis.

In April 1995 after another loss, Mabel and Mo attacked the Smoking Gunns in a fit of anger, then apologized for it later on. When they asked the Gunns to come to the ring to let them apologize, Men on a Mission attacked them once again and then beat up Oscar, turning the duo heel and dropping their rapping manager.

After a short feud with the Smoking Gunns, Mabel won the 1995 King of the Ring tournament. He became King Mabel with his trusty sidekick being dubbed "Sir Mo", wrestling royalty. When Mabel became king, the focus shifted from the team to Mabel once more with Sir Mo acting more as a manager and less like an active competitor as Mabel challenged for the WWF Championship. One of the last notable appearances for Men on a Mission was at In Your House 2 where they beat Razor Ramon and Savio Vega. They were also the opponents in the match where the British Bulldog turned on partner Diesel. Mo lost to The Undertaker on Monday Night Raw's November 27, 1995 episode during Mabel's feud with Taker. Mo's last WWF match was a lost to Marty Jannetty on January 12, 1996 in a house show at the Montreal Forum making it the last wrestling event at the Forum before it was demolished. Mabel and Mo's last appearance in the WWF together was at the 1996 Royal Rumble, where Mo accompanied Mabel at ringside, while he participated in the match, until he was eliminated by Yokozuna. Afterwards they left the WWF.

Return to USWA and Independent circuit (1996-2007)
After leaving the WWF Mo and Mabel returned to the USWA where they feuded with Brian Christopher, Jerry Lawler and The Moondogs. They would disbanded in June 1996. After Men On A Mission, Mo became a part of the original Nation of Domination, the stable that was a forerunner to the more famous stable in the WWF. Mo became "Sir Mohammad", using a black supremacist gimmick. The USWA version of the N.O.D. was led by PG-13 J. C. Ice and Wolfie D) and also included Kareem Olajuwon (Reggie B. Fine), Akeem Muhamad (Big Black Dog), Elijah (the Spellbinder), Shaquille Ali (Tracy Smothers), Randy X, and Queen Moishe (Jacqueline).  After group disbanded, Faarooq started the Nation of Domination in the WWF, due to the USWA version of the group disbanding, where they had major success.

Horne would remain in the Memphis region wrestling mainly as Rob Harlem, competing under that name in the USWA, its successor “Memphis Pro Wrestling”, and Randy Hales’ “Power Pro Wrestling”. USWA shut down in November 1997. In 1997, Horne would start his own promotion “Southern Extreme Wrestling” which he both booked and wrestled for. Horne’s “Southern Extreme Wrestling” is not affiliated with the "Southern Extreme Wrestling Promotions" organization that operates today. He returned to WWF as Buzz on September 6, 1997 beating a jobber at a house show in Nashville, Tennessee.

While in PPW, Horne teamed up with “Deon Harlem” to form the tag team “The Regulators”. The team beat Derrick King in a Handicap match to win the PPW Tag Team Title, which they held when the promotion closed down in April 2001 and took a hiatus from wrestling.

In 2003, Bobby Horne returned to wrestling and added yet another gimmick to his long list of gimmicks. On December 30, Mabel was at ringside commentating when manager Paul Wylde came out and introduced the “Bahamian Heavyweight Champion” "Marly Pride". Wylde started making comments that Mabel was the fattest whale which Mabel took exception to. When the big man entered the ring, Marley Pride was revealed as his former tag-team partner Mo who attacked him and the two brawled until they were separated by officials. Mo and Mabel had a short feud in Memphis Wrestling. On March 1, 2006 Horne as Mo defeated Bad News at a dark match for Ohio Valley Wrestling. Then on April 21, 2007 Mo defeated Christian York at ISPW in Newton, New Jersey. He then retired from wrestling and went into truck driving. 

Also he was the promoter for New Blood Wrestling in Dyersburg, Tennessee from 2006 to 2009.

Return To Independent circuit (2014-present)
In 2014, Horne came out of retirement and defeated Mike King at HLW Heroes and Legends III in Fort Wayne, Indiana.

In May 2015, he worked four shows as Sir Mo teaming with Davey Boy Smith Jr. for Ultimate Championship Wrestling in Nova Scotia, Canada. He returned to the Maritimes in July with partner Lord Deon (Johnson) for three more shows. On July 30, the team - known as MOM2K - won the UCW tag team titles by beating Sidewalk Sam and Homeless Bob in Halifax, Nova Scotia.

Since January 2016, Horne has run SOAR Championship Wrestling with his wife Denise Jones in Dallas Texas.

Personal life
Horne has had many health issues in recent years. In 2018, he got a kidney transplant and he was told at the time that he would need to take anti-rejection medication for the rest of his life.

In January 2022, Horne's health got worse as he needed a liver transplant. Doctors became concerned about his body rejecting a new liver. He was hospitalized in the ICU battling COVID-19. On February 4 of that year he was released from hospital and made a Facebook post on his account telling them that he was in a medical rehab facility where he was still using an oxygen tank and on antibiotics. Also his kidneys have improved and no longer on a dialysis. He still has strength issues and is resting at home. Horne thanked the fans and his wife, Denise for helping him during his recovery.

Championships and accomplishments

New England Pro Wrestling Hall of Fame
Class of 2013
Power Pro Wrestling
PPW Tag Team Championship (1 time) - with Deon Harlem
Pro Wrestling Illustrated
Ranked #144 of the top 500 singles wrestlers in the PWI 500 in 1995
Ranked #468 of the 500 best singles wrestlers of the PWI Years in 2003
Pro Wrestling Federation
PWF Tag Team Championship (4 times) - with Nelson Knight (1), Mabel (1), Black Angel (2)
Southeastern Championship Wrestling
SCW United States Heavyweight Championship (1 time)
Ultimate Championship Wrestling
UCW Tag Team Championship (1 time) - with Mom 2K 
World Wrestling Federation
WWF World Tag Team Championship (1 time) - with Mabel
Wrestling Observer Newsletter
Worst Worked Match of the Year (1993) with Mabel and The Bushwhackers vs. The Headshrinkers, Bastion Booger, and Bam Bam Bigelow at Survivor Series

References

External links

1967 births
African-American male professional wrestlers
American male professional wrestlers
Living people
The Nation of Domination members
People from Harlem
Professional wrestlers from New York (state)
21st-century African-American people
20th-century African-American sportspeople
Professional wrestlers from New York City